Wolford is an unincorporated community in Buchanan County, Virginia, United States. Wolford has a post office with ZIP code 24658, which opened on August 22, 1949. The community was likely named for John Wolford, a pioneer.

References

Unincorporated communities in Buchanan County, Virginia
Unincorporated communities in Virginia